Congress's Bharat Jodo Yatra started from Kanyakumari and ended in Srinagar in January 2023. Bharat Jodo Yatra covered  . There are several parallels between the Congress's 'Bharat Jodo Yatra' and ex-prime minister of India Chandra Shekhar's nearly 4,260 kilometres-long Bharat Yatra in 1983.
 
Bharat Jodo Yatra entered Kerala on September 10 evening, witnessing a huge turnout in the state, especially in Thiruvananthapuram, where a huge number of citizens participated in the yatra. On 28 September, the Bharat Jodo Yatra entered Wayanad in Kerala, Rahul Gandhi's constituency. Congress leader Jairam Ramesh said that a "new, young, and aggressive Congress" will emerge at the end of the yatra. He also added that the yatra will act like a booster dose for the party. "This is a part of the revival plan for Congress".

The Bharat Jodo Yatra for early-September 2022 was the jobs crisis in India, with Rahul Gandhi questioning why 42% of Indian youth are unemployed.

The march protested the unprecedented costs of fuel and cooking gas in India during September 2022.

Starting from late-September 2022, the Yatra focused on women's safety, a theme that the women and youth wings of the Congress sought to highlight after the murder of Ankita Bhandari, a 19 year old receptionist at a Uttarakhand resort owned by Pulkit Arya, son of a local BJP leader, who reportedly resisted demands by Arya that she "offer special services" to certain guests.

Rahul Gandhi and the march celebrated the 153rd birth anniversary of Mahatma Gandhi at Badanavalu, a village the latter had visited in 1927. Rahul Gandhi interacted with the women weavers at the Khadi manufacturing centre there and also laid the last stretch of a 180 metre long road that finally connected two communities who had been at loggerheads with each other in the village since 1993. On 3 October 2022, Congress Party launched its Bharat Jodo App to provide all the information about the Bharat Jodo Yatra.

Sonia Gandhi, interim president of the Congress party, joined the Bharat Jodo Yatra in Karnataka on 6 October 2022. Despite ill-health that prevented her from appearing in public in 2022, she undertook a symbolic march along with Yatra participants for a while, her first public roadshow since one in 2016 in Varanasi.

The yatra highlighted the importance of organ donation on 12 October 2022. Rahul Gandhi walked with the families of several donors, including Sanchari Vijay, who had passed away but whose organs saved other lives. Gandhi also noted the generosity of Dr. Rajkumar and his son, Puneeth Rajkumar, both of whom had donated their eyes. 33 participants in the yatra took the pledge to donate their eyes. The rate of organ donation in India, at approximately 0.08 per million population, is relatively low.

Timeline

Tamil Nadu 

 7 September 2022: Rahul Gandhi launches the yatra at Kanyakumari after paying tributes to his late father Rajiv Gandhi, Swami Vivekananda, and the Tamil poet Thriuvalluvar. The Congress dubs the yatra as "India's biggest mass contact program" where the concerns of the people will reach Delhi.

 8 September 2022: The second day of the yatra commences at Agasteeswaram, Kanyakumari. Rahul Gandhi slams the BJP and the RSS saying saying that "They think the flag is their personal property". Senior Congress leaders P. Chidambaram, Bhupesh Baghel and others join the yatra.
 9 September 2022: The yatra kicks off at Nagercoil with Rahul Gandhi hosting the national flag at Scott Christian College. He also interacted with farmers who had protested during the 2020–2021 Indian farmers' protest.
 10 September 2022: Rahul Gandhi interacts with sanitary workers at Marthandam and a local group of unemployed youth. He also meets with differently abled rights activists and tweeted in support of them. He entered Kerala in the evening of the same day, welcomed by Kerala PCC workers.

Kerala 

 11 September 2022: Rahul Gandhi enters Kerala, as thousands of supporters and onlookers gather to welcome him. Gandhi said that the yatra is an extension of the ideas prevailing in Kerala.
 12 September 2022: Bharat Jodo Yatra witnesses an extremely high turnout in Thiruvananthapuram, the capital of Kerala.
 13 September 2022: The yatra commences from Kaniyapuram, a suburb of Thiruvananthapuram, again with a huge turnout.
 14 September 2022: The yatra reaches Kollam, Rahul Gandhi visits Sivagiri Mutt to pay respects to Sri Narayana Guru.
 15 September 2022: Rahul Gandhi and other yatris take a break for the day at Kollam.
 16 September 2022: The yatra resumes, Rahul Gandhi meets entrepreneurs and cashew workers in Kollam. Many cashew workers share their grievances with Rahul Gandhi, who promised to bring it up in the upcoming parliamentary session. He also said that their problems will be solved if the Congress led-UDF comes to power in Kerala.
 17 September 2022: The yatra enters Alappuzha district.
 18 September 2022: The 11th day of the yatra commences from Haripad, a video of Rahul Gandhi helping a little girl to wear her sandals in Ambalappuzha goes viral.
 19 September 2022: Yatra commences from Punnapra Aravukad, Alappuzha. Rahul Gandhi discusses rising fuel costs and reduced subsidies with local fishermen in Kerala. Gandhi also rows Kerala's famous snake boat, winning the race. The Congress is furious over inappropriate tweets by BJP leaders on Rahul Gandhi and the yatra.
 20 September 2022: Bharat Jodo enters Kochi. Sachin Pilot joins the yatra.
 21 September 2022: Yatra commences from Madavana town in Kochi.
 22 September 2022: Yatra commences from the Union Christian College, Aluva. Rahul Gandhi pays floral tributes to Mahatma Gandhi.
 23 September 2022: Yatris take a break at Perambra. BJP leaders falsely allege this was in solidarity with the PFI, as it called for a bandh on the day. The Congress had already pre-planned the date for a rest.
 24 September 2022: Yatra resumes Perambra in Thrissur district.
 25 September 2022: Yatra commences from Thrissur as Hollywood actor John Cusack expresses his solidarity with Rahul Gandhi and supports the Bharat Jodo Yatra.
 26 September 2022: Bharat Jodo Yatra enters Palakkad, garlanding a Mahatma Gandhi statue on the way to Pattambi.
 27 September 2022: Yatra commences from Pulamantol, enters Malappuram. A plea to regulate the Bharat Jodo Yatra is dismissed by Kerala High Court.
 28 September 2022: Last day of Bharat Jodo Yatra in Kerala, as it passes through Tamil Nadu moving to Karnataka.
 29 September 2022: Bharat Jodo enters Gudalur in Tamil Nadu, due to reach Karnataka the following day.

Karnataka 
 30 September 2022: The Bharat Jodo Yatra began in Karnataka with huge crowds in Gundulpet as Rahul Gandhi was welcomed by Karnataka PCC leaders to the state.
 1 October 2022: Bharat Jodo Yatra starts day 2 in Karnataka; police department has lodged FIR with an worker for showing PayCM poster.
 2 October 2022: Yatra starts from Badanavalu, Rahul Gandhi pays floral tributes to Mahatma Gandhi on the occasion of Gandhi Jayanti. He said the Congress will continue to raise the issue of corruption in Karnataka. The Congress also targeted the Karnataka government on its handling of the COVID-19 crisis in Karnataka.
 3 October 2022: Bharat Jodo Yatra enters Mysore, where it sees quite a strong response. Rahul Gandhi gives a speech, braving the rain, "It is raining, but nothing can stop the yatra against deterring hate and violence spread by the BJP-RSS". Sonia Gandhi arrives in Mysore, where she is scheduled to participate in the yatra starting from 6 October.
 4 October 2022: Yatra takes a two-day break at Mandya.
 5 October 2022: Yatra set to resume tomorrow.
 6 October 2022: Sonia Gandhi, interim president of the Congress, joins the yatra as it resumes from Mandya. She interacted with many yatris, as many women flocked to see her.
 7 October 2022: Late journalist Gauri Lankesh's family joins Bharat Jodo Yatra as it completes 30 days on the road. During an interaction with representatives of many educational institutions and teachers, Rahul Gandhi said  there was no intention of making Hindi alone the national language and threaten the identity of regional languages like Kannada.
 8 October 2022: Yatra starts from Mayasandra in Tumkur district. JD(S) Karnataka MLA S. R. Srinivas joins Bharat Jodo Yatra, setting off speculations that he may join Congress soon.
 9 October 2022: Yatra begins in Tiptur, passing through BJP strongholds in Karnataka, receiving an impressive response from the local public.
 10 October 2022: Bharat Jodo continued to march through Tumkur district. Rahul Gandhi condoled the death of Netaji Mulayam Singh Yadav.
 11 October 2022: Yatra resumed from Chitradurga.
 12 October 2022: Rahul Gandhi meets thousands of unemployed youth in Chitradurga.
 13 October 2022: Congress stresses importance of the Kannada language in the yatra.
 15 October 2022: Bharat Jodo Yatra reentered Karnataka and completed 1000 km when it reached Bellary district.

Andhra Pradesh 
 14 October 2022: Bharat Jodo Yatra entered D. Hirehal mandal of Anantapur district in Andhra Pradesh.
 18 October 2022: Bharat Jodo Yatra reentered  in Andhra Pradesh in Halaharvi in Kurnool district.

 19 October 2022: Rahul Gandhi addressed a press conference in Andhra Pradesh and attacked the YSRCP, TDP, JSP and the BJP for corrupted government in the state, and promised special category status for Andhra Pradesh if congress regain power at center.

Telangana 
 27 October 2022: After a break of three days, the Congress's Bharat Jodi Yatra has resumed from Maktal in Narayanpet district.
 29 October 2022 : On 52nd day, and fourth day in Telangana for Bharat Jodo Yatra, the Congress leader Rahul Gandhi was joined by Tollywood actress Poonam Kaur during his walk towards Mahabubnagar district’s Jadcherla town, where he addressed a meeting in evening.
 31 October 2022 : Bharat Jodo Yatra continued from Shadnagar bus depot to Thondapalli, Shamshabad.  During a press interaction in Telangana’s Kothur in Ranga Reddy district, Rahul Gandhi said he is in full support of a caste-based census and publication of the data of the Other Backward Classes (OBC) from Socio Economic and Caste Census 2011.
 1 November 2022 : Late Dalit scholar Rohith Vemula’s mother joined to walk in Bharat Jodo Yatra along with Rahul Gandhi, en route to Hyderabad. Rahul Gandhi unfurled the national flag in front of Charminar, over 32 years after his father and then party chief Rajiv Gandhi had started the Sadbhavna Yatra from the same spot on 19 October 1990. The yatra’s night halt was at Gandhi Ideology Centre in Bowenpally, Secunderabad.
 2 November 2022 : actress- film maker Pooja Bhatt joined Rahul Gandhi in Bharat Jodo Yatra in Hyderabad on the 56th day of the yatra.

Maharashtra
 7 November 2022 : On its 61st day, Bharat Jodo Yatra entered Maharashtra in evening of 7 November 2022. The yatra crossed from  Menuru village of Madnoor Mandal in Jukkal constituency in Telangana to Nanded district in Maharashtra.
 10 November 2022: Bollywood actor Sushant Singh joined Bharat Jodo Yatra in Nanded.
16 November 2022: activist Medha Patkar joined Bharat Jodo Yatra in Washim.
17 November 2022: Actress Riya Sen joined Bharat Jodo Yatra in Akola, Maharastra. Rahul Gandhi reiterated that Vinayak Damodar Savarkar had helped the British.
18 November 2022: Mahatma Gandhi's great-grandson Tushar Gandhi and actress Mona Ambegaonkar joined Rahul during Bharat Jodo Yatra in Shegaon in Buldhana district.
19 November 2022: On the day of birth anniversary of Indira Gandhi, actress Rashami Desai , Akanksha Puri and Nagma  joined Bharat Jodo Yatra in Buldhana district.
20 November 2022:Actor Amol Palekar joined Bharat Jodo Yatra on its last day in Maharashtra in Jalgaon Jamod. A light show was organised at Nimkhed where the Yatra concluded its journey in the state.

Madhya Pradesh
23 November 2022: Bharat Jodo Yatra entered in Madhya Pradesh through Bodarli village in Burhanpur district.
 24 November 2022: Priyanka Gandhi and her husband Robert Vadra joined Bharat Jodo Yatra in Madhya Pradesh.
27 November 2022: Bharat Jodo Concert was held at Chiman Bagh in Indore. Rapper Divine (rapper) along with MC Altaf and DJ Proof performed at the event.

Rajasthan
4 December 2022: Bharat Jodo Yatra entered Rajasthan, a Congress ruled state for the first time.  
11 December 2022: Ashok Chandana joined Bharat Jodo Yatra in Bundi district.
14 December 2022: Former RBI governor Raghuram Rajan joined Bharat Jodo Yatra in  Sawai Madhopur district.
16 December 2022: Singer Sunidhi Chauhan performed at a concert marking the completion of 100 days of Bharat Jodo Yatra, at Albert Hall Museum in Jaipur.
19 December 2022: While addressing a rally in Rajasthan's Alwar, Rahul Gandhi highlighted the importance of English language and said that around 1,700 English medium schools have been opened in Rajasthan. He said that BJP leaders don't want English to be taught in schools. But children of all their leaders go to English medium schools. Former Punjab Chief minister Charanjit Singh Channi joined Bharat jodo yatra in Rajasthan on 20 December

Haryana
21 December 2022: Bharat Jodo Yatra entered Haryana from Mundaka border in Nuh district. Bharat Jodo Yatra resumed from Patan Udaipuri in Nuh, Haryana after the flag handover ceremony.
23 December 2022: DMK MP Kanimozhi joined Bharat Jodo Yatra in Haryana.

Delhi
24 December 2022: Bharat Jodo Yatra entered Delhi at Badarpur Border, after resuming Yatra from NHPC metro station. During his speech at Red Fort, Rahul Gandhi said that he had not seen any hatred or violence among people while walking 2,800 km. Bharat Jodo Yatra covered 3,122 km from Gandhi Mandapam in Kanyakumari to the Red Fort in Delhi.

Uttar Pradesh
 2 January 2023: Samajwadi Party's Chief and Former Uttar Pradesh Chief Minister Akhilesh Yadav, Bahujan Samaj Party's Chief and Former Uttar Pradesh Chief Minister Mayawati, Rashtriya Lok Dal's Chief Jayant Singh wishes Rahul Gandi for Bharat Jodo Yatra
 3 January 2023: Bharat Jodo Yatra entered Uttar Pradesh from Loni border in Ghaziabad district. Former RAW chief A. S. Dulat and National President of Jammu & Kashmir National Conference, former Jammu and Kashmir Chief Minister Farooq Abdullah joined Bharat Jodo Yatra.
  On 5 January 2023: Bollywood actress Ritu Shivpuri joined 'Bharat Jodo Yatra' in Shamli, Uttar Pradesh.

Punjab
 10 January 2023: Bharat Jodo yatra entered Punjab through Shambhu border. Rahul Gandhi visited the Golden Temple in Amritsar, before the yatra started in the state.
 14 January 2023: Bharat Jodo Yatra entered Doaba region of Punjab. Congress MP from Jalandhar Santokh Singh Chaudhary passed away during Bharat Jodo Yatra in Punjab, after suffering a heart attack during Bharat Jodo Yatra in Phillaur. The Yatra was cancelled for the rest of the day.
 15 January 2023: The father of late Punjabi singer Sidhu Moose Wala and historian Mridula Mukherjee joined the Bharat Jodo Yatra.

Himachal Pradesh
 18 January 2023: Bharat Jodo Yatra entered Himachal Pradesh and travelled 24 km in the state.

Jammu and Kashmir
 19 January 2023: In the evening, Bharat Jodo Yatra entered Jammu and Kashmir (union territory) from Punjab’s Pathankot with a flag handover ceremony at Lakhanpur in Kathua district. National Conference President and MP Farooq Abdullah also compared Rahul Gandhi To Adi Shankaracharya and stated that Shankaracharya was the first person who conducted a digvijaya yatra from Kanyakumari to Kashmir and similarly, Rahul Gandhi is doing that yet again.
20 January 2023: Param Vir Chakra recipient Captain Bana Singh joined Bharat Jodo Yatra in Jammu and Kashmir.
24 January 2023: Actor-politician Urmila Matondkar and prominent author Perumal Murugan joined the Bharat Jodo Yatra in Jammu's garrison town of Nagrota.
29 January 2023: Rahul Gandhi unfurled national tricolour at Lal Chowk in Srinagar bringing the padyatra to an end.

See also
 1983 Bharat Yatra
 1987 Mahashanti Padyatra
 1991 Ekta Yatra
 Ram Rath Yatra
 Long March

References

External links 

2022 in India